Thamarassery, formerly known as Thazhmalachery, it is one of the taluk in Kozhikode district and major hill town in the Kozhikode district of Kerala, India, 30 km north-east of Kozhikode (Calicut) City and 29 km east of Koyilandy. It lies on the Calicut - Wayanad - Mysore route (National Highway 212).

History 
Thamarassery belonged to the Kingdom of Kottayam before India became independent. It has witnessed the departure of the British and the great march of Tipu Sultan. Kottayam Kings who died fighting the British were given part of the land of Thamarassery in the days before freedom. The tomb of Payyampally Chandu, who was a warrior under the Kottayam Raja, is located at the Thamarassery Kotayil Sree Bhagavathi Temple.

In 1936 the Thamarassery panchayat was formed, although a public health center had already been operating for some time prior. Attakoya Thangal was the first panchayat president. JT Abdurahiman Master is the president of the Thamarassery Panchayath (since 2020 December 30).

Administration
Thamarassery panchayat is divided into 19 wards. Thamarassery panchayat comes under Koduvally state assembly constituency and Kozhikode loksabha constituency. Current MP is MK Raghavan of Congress and MLA is MK Muneer of Muslim League. Thamarassery constitutes a taluk within the Kozhikode district.

Landmarks 

 The Syro-Malabar Catholic Diocese of Thamarassery
 Thamarassery Public Library (which was founded in 1946)
 Mini Civil Station and Taluk office
 Kedavoor Juma Masjid
 Mary Matha Cathedral Church 
 Court Complex
 The office of the DYSP
 Taluk Hospital
 Govt. Veterinary Hospital
 Kozhikode rural district Treasury
 Head Post office
 BSNL divisional office
 Forest and wildlife range office
 Excise Range and Circle offices

Economy 
Thamarassery is an agricultural area, and a large portion of its population are farmers. Coconut and rubber are the major products. Kerala's first rubber estate, now in the hands of AV Thomas and Co., is located here.

Transportation 
Thamarassery is well connected to its surrounding areas via roads, which reach from it to Kozhikode, Kalpetta, Koyilandy, and Mukkam. Bus service is also available regularly. The Kerala State Road Transport Corporation (KSRTC) has a bus stand and depot at Thamarassery. All private buses operate from the New Bus Stand at Karadi nearby the KSRTC depot. The nearest airport, Calicut International Airport is 45 km away, while the Kozhikode Railway Station is 30km away.

The KSRTC bus service provides good connections to Kasargod, Kannur, Palakkad, Thrissur, Kottayam and Trivandrum. Several interstate bus services pass through Thamarassery, providing connections to Bengaluru, Mysuru, Ooty, Devala, Gundalpet and other places.

Tourism 

Many tourist attractions are located nearby the town are
Thamarassery Churam
 Thusharagiri Falls
 Vayalada Viewpoint
 Kakkayam Dam
 Thonikadavu
 Vanaparvam Biodiversity Park
 Narangathode Falls

Notable People from Thamarassery 
•Director Hariharan 

•Sports reporter VM Balachandran (popularly known as Vimcy)

•Asharaf Thamarassery, UAE based social worker

•Shani Prabhakaran, TV journalist

•Anjali Ameer, actress

•AK Shaji, founder of MyG electronics retail 

•Kishore Kumar, former Indian volleyball captain

Abdul Azeez. C P ( Azeez Avelam)
 Working Group Member(Traditional Industries)State Planning Board Kerala.

Villages in Thamarassery Taluk
The position of the Thamarassery Taluk in Kozhikode district is given below:

There are 20 villages in Thamarassery Taluk :
 Koodaranji
 Thiruvambady
Nellipoyil
 Koduvally
 Puthur
 Kizhakkoth
 Narikkuni
 Raroth
 Kadavoor
 Kodanchery
 Puthuppadi
Koodathai
 Kanthalad
 Vavad
Engapuzha
Kinaloor
 Panangad
 Sivapuram

Educational Organizations in Thamarassery 
 Government Vocational Higher Secondary School Thamarassery, Korangad
 Government UP School Karadi
 GMUP School Raroth
 Pallippuram UP School, Chalakkara
 Nusrath Islamic Residential School Parappanpoyil
 St.Alphonsa English Senior Secondary School 
 Alphonsa nursery school 
 IHRD College Korangad, Thamarassery
 Govt LP school, Thekkumthottam
 The Govt LP school, Korangad
 The Govt LP school, Chungam
 Vezhuppur UP school
 Pallippuram LP School
 Govt LP school, Chembra
 St. Mary's Higher Secondary School Koodathai

References

External links 

Thamarassery Grama Panchayat
 Thamarassery page on the india9.com website
 www.thamarasseryonline.com
 Diocese of Thamarassery

Cities and towns in Kozhikode district
Thamarassery area